Binx (born 26 February 1992) is a South African singer and musician.

Her debut EP, The African Bee, was well-received by critics.

Life
Binx was born Bianca Carmen Buys in Elliot, South Africa in 1992, and moved to East London, South Africa with her family in 2002. After being discovered by a Sony Music scout, she moved to Manhattan, New York in 2012.

References

Pop Crush, September 2017, http://popcrush.com/binx-buzzed-fathers-death-interview/
Pop Dust, May 2017, https://www.popdust.com/binx-headlights-video-premiere-2427860215.html?slide=TpKmFd

1992 births
Living people